Bacchisa kweichowensis is a species of beetle in the family Cerambycidae. It was described by Breuning in 1959. It is known from China.

References

K
Beetles described in 1959